John Ingersoll Gilbert (October 11, 1837 Pittsford, Rutland County, Vermont – December 19, 1904) was an American politician from New York.

Life
He attended Castleton Seminary, North Granville Academy, and Barre Academy, and graduated from the University of Vermont in 1859. Then he taught school. He was Principal of the Royalton Academy for two years, and of the Franklin Academy in Malone for six years. He also studied law, was admitted to the bar, and practiced in Malone.

Gilbert was a member of the New York State Assembly (Franklin Co.) in 1876, 1877 and 1878.

He was a member of the New York State Senate (20th D.) in 1884 and 1885. He was a delegate to the 1884 Republican National Convention.

At the New York state election, 1889 he ran for Secretary of State of New York, but was defeated by Democrat Frank Rice. Gilbert was a delegate to the New York State Constitutional Convention of 1894.

Sources
 The New York Red Book compiled by Edgar L. Murlin (published by James B. Lyon, Albany NY, 1897; pg. 403 and 497f)
 Biographical sketches of the Members of the Legislature in The Evening Journal Almanac (1885)
 Bio transcribed from Historical Sketches of Franklin County by Frederick J. Seaver (1918)

1837 births
1904 deaths
Republican Party New York (state) state senators
People from Malone, New York
Republican Party members of the New York State Assembly
University of Vermont alumni
People from Pittsford, Vermont
19th-century American politicians